The United States Senate Committee on Corporations Organized in the District of Columbia was formed as a select committee in 1892, and became a standing committee in 1896.  In 1921, it was abolished.

Robert M. La Follette had the distinction of chairing the committee during the 63rd through the 65th Congress, even though he was a member of the minority Republican Party. This was because the Senate had 73 standing committees in the 63rd Congress, several more than there were Democrats to chair them. Therefore, some members of the minority party were allowed to chair certain minor committees.

Chairmen of the Select Committee on Corporations Organized in the District of Columbia, 1892–1896
Arthur P. Gorman (D-MD) 1892–1893
Nelson W. Aldrich (R-RI) 1893–1895
James K. Jones (D-AR) 1895–1896

Chairmen of the Committee on Corporations Organized in the District of Columbia, 1896–1921
James K. Jones (D-AR) 1896–1897
John W. Daniel (D-VA) 1897–1899
Donelson Caffery (D-LA) 1899–1901
Thomas S. Martin (D-VA) 1901–1905
Samuel McEnery (D-LA) 1905–1908
Hernando D. Money (D-MS) 1908–1909
James P. Taliaferro (D-FL) 1909–1911
Francis G. Newlands (D-NV) 1911–1912
William J. Stone (D-MO) 1912–1913
Robert M. La Follette (R-WI) 1913–1919
Atlee Pomerene (D-OH) 1919–1921

References

Corporations Organized in the District of Columbia
Economy of Washington, D.C.
1892 establishments in Washington, D.C.
1921 disestablishments in Washington, D.C.